Lake Fork Gunnison River or (Lake Fork) is a  tributary of the Gunnison River in Colorado.  The river's source is Sloan Lake near Handies Peak in the San Juan Mountains of Hinsdale County.  Lake Fork flows through Lake San Cristobal and Lake City before a confluence with the Gunnison River in Blue Mesa Reservoir.

See also
List of rivers of Colorado
List of tributaries of the Colorado River

References

Gunnison River
Rivers of Colorado
Rivers of Gunnison County, Colorado
Rivers of Hinsdale County, Colorado
Tributaries of the Colorado River in Colorado